Jindřich Tintěra (7 February 1901 – 10 July 1996) was a Czech gymnast. He competed in eight events at the 1936 Summer Olympics.

References

1901 births
1996 deaths
Czech male artistic gymnasts
Olympic gymnasts of Czechoslovakia
Gymnasts at the 1936 Summer Olympics
Gymnasts from Prague